La suerte de Loli (English title: Loli's Fate) is an American telenovela that aired on Telemundo from 26 January 2021 to 21 June 2021. Silvia Navarro stars as the titular character. Production of the series began in September 2020.

Plot 
Loli Aguilar is an independent and successful woman who works as the executive producer of Global Radio Group, the number one radio station in the West Coast of the United States. While Loli's career is on the rise, her love life goes into the background as she enjoys her freedom and life without compromises. However, her life takes an unexpected turn when Mariana, her best friend, passes away and leaves everything to Loli, including her two children. The news leaves everyone surprised especially Loli, who feels like the least indicated person for that responsibility. Loli will have to face her new reality and learn that work is not everything in life, and discover that the true meaning of success is family and love.

Cast 
An extensive cast list was published on 15 October 2020 in a press release.

Main 
 Silvia Navarro as Dolores "Loli" Aguilar
 Osvaldo Benavides as Rafael Contreras
 Gaby Espino as Paulina Castro
 Carlos Ponce as Armando
 Mariana Seoane as Melissa
 Joaquín Ferreira as Octavio
 Rodrigo Vidal as Bruno Torres
 Rosa María Bianchi as Norita
 Christian Chávez as Matías
 Alejandro López as Vicente Varela
 Dalexa Meneses as Samantha "Sam" Torres
 Marielena Davila as Jessica Contreras
 Andrés Cotrino as Gabriel
 Liz Dieppa as Carol Torres
 Diego Escalona as Nicolás "Nicky" Torres
 Amaranta Ruiz as Guadalupe
 Gisella Aboumrad as Rox
 Javier Díaz Dueñas 
 Polo Monárrez as Apolo
 Vince Miranda as Arturo
 Karla Monroig as Rebeca
 Roberto Escobar as Rogelio
 Mika Kubo as Angie
 Fernando Carrera as Marcelino
 Maite Embil as Bertha Morales
 Ricardo Kleinbaum as Licenciado Ferrer
 Jeimy Osorio as Karen
 Jesús Moré as Salvador

Recurring 
 Cesar Rodriguez as Leonardo
 Martha Mijares as Selma
 Laura Garrido as Gema 
  Xavier Ruvalcaba as Joaquin
  Wendy Regalado as Dulce
  Jairo Calero  as Jack
  George Akram as David
  Rafael Pedroza as Artemio
  Eduardo Serrano as Alonso
  Anna Silvetti as Veronica

Guest stars 
 Jacqueline Bracamontes as Mariana
 Paulina Rubio as herself
 Lupillo Rivera as himself
 Luis Coronel as himself
 Alan Ramírez as himself
 Oswaldo Silvas as himself
 Manuel Turizo as himself
 Alberto Cortez as himself

Episodes

Reception

Ratings 
   
}}

Awards and nominations

References

External links 
 

2021 telenovelas
2021 American television series debuts
2021 American television series endings
Spanish-language American telenovelas
Spanish-language telenovelas
American telenovelas
Telemundo telenovelas
Telemundo original programming
2020s American LGBT-related drama television series